The anime series Kaguya-sama: Love Is War is based on the manga series of the same title, written and illustrated by Aka Akasaka. The anime television series adaptation was announced by Shueisha on June 1, 2018. The series was directed by Shinichi Omata under the pseudonym Mamoru Hatakeyama and written by Yasuhiro Nakanishi, with animation by A-1 Pictures. Yuuko Yahiro provided the character designs, while Jin Aketagawa served the sound director and Kei Haneoka composed the series' music. The series premiered from January 12 to March 30, 2019, broadcasting on MBS, Tokyo MX, BS11, GTV, GYT, CTV, and TeNY. The series ran for 12 episodes. Aniplex of America have acquired the series in North America, and streamed the series on Crunchyroll, Hulu, and FunimationNow. In Australia and New Zealand, AnimeLab simulcasted the series within the region.

A second season titled Kaguya-sama: Love Is War? was announced on October 19, 2019. The staff and cast returned to reprise their roles. The season premiered from April 11 to June 27, 2020 on the same Japanese stations as the first, though its world premiere took place prior to Japanese broadcast at Anime Festival Sydney on March 8, 2020.

On October 25, 2020, an original video animation and a third season were announced for production during the "Kaguya-sama Wants To Tell You On Stage" special event. The OVA was bundled with the manga's twenty-second volume, which was released on May 19, 2021. The third season titled Kaguya-sama: Love Is War – Ultra Romantic premiered on April 9, 2022, with returning staff and cast members.

Following the conclusion of the third season, a new anime project was announced.

Series overview

Episode list

Season 1 (2019)

Season 2: Love Is War? (2020)

Season 3: Love Is War – Ultra Romantic (2022)

References

 
Kaguya-sama: Love Is War